Ömer Elmas (born November 30, 1968 or January 1, 1969) is a Turkish wrestler.

He competed for Turkey at the 1992 Summer Olympics, at the age of 23, in Barcelona, in Greco-Roman Wrestling - Men's Light-Flyweight. He lost to Nik Zagranitchni of Israel by decision in the first round, and to Wilber Sánchez of Cuba by decision in the second round.

References

External links
 

Wrestlers at the 1992 Summer Olympics
Turkish male sport wrestlers
Olympic wrestlers of Turkey
Living people
1968 births
20th-century Turkish people